Charles "Chuck" Lovell is the chief of police of the Portland Police Bureau, in Portland, Oregon.  He was named chief on June 8, 2020, amid protests over the murder of George Floyd and police brutality. Lovell is the fourth black head of the Portland Police and the 50th police chief in PPB's history.

Early life and education
Lovell was born in Brooklyn, New York. He joined the United States Air Force at age 19 and served four years on active duty and two in the reserves. He received his Bachelor of Criminal Justice degree from Park University. He is pursuing a master's degree in strategic leadership from the University of Charleston.

Career
Lovell has been on the Portland police force since 2002. He was most recently head of the Community Services Division.

He was a lieutenant when Chief Jami Resch resigned and asked him to replace her in June 2020, following criticism over the department's response to protests following the murder of George Floyd.

Personal life
Lovell lives outside Portland, in Washington County.

References

Year of birth missing (living people)
Living people
African-American police officers
Chiefs of the Portland Police Bureau
Park University alumni
United States Air Force airmen
University of Charleston alumni
21st-century African-American people
African-American history of Oregon